Nieul is a commune in the Haute-Vienne department in the Nouvelle-Aquitaine region in west-central France.

Inhabitants are known as Nieulois in French.

Communication
At Nieul, there was a medium wave broadcasting station, which transmitted on 792 kHz with 300 kW and closed in July 2014. It used as an antenna a 90 metres tall mast radiator insulated against ground.

See also
 Communes of the Haute-Vienne department

References

Communes of Haute-Vienne
County of La Marche